Carthage School District No. 9 was a school district based in Carthage, Arkansas.

It was administratively divided between an elementary school and a high school.

By 2004 new laws were passed requiring school districts with enrollments below 350 to consolidate with other school districts. Carthage was one of several districts that were unable to find another district willing to consolidate with it, so the Arkansas Board of Education was to forcibly consolidate it. On July 1, 2004, it consolidated into the Malvern School District.

References

External links
 Carthage School District No. 9 Dallas County, Arkansas General Purpose Financial Statements and Other Reports June 30, 2000 
 Carthage School District No. 9 Dallas County, Arkansas General Purpose Financial Statements and Other Reports June 30, 2003 

Defunct school districts in Arkansas
Education in Dallas County, Arkansas
2004 disestablishments in Arkansas
School districts disestablished in 2004